"Anne or Beast?" is the first segment of the first episode of the Disney Channel animated series, Amphibia. The episode was written by Matt Braly and Jack Ferraiolo and directed by Bert Youn. In the episode, a pink frog named Sprig Plantar tries to capture a mysterious beast to prove that he's responsible, only to be caught by a human teenage girl named Anne Boonchuy.

The episode premiered on Disney Channel on June 17, 2019 to strong positive reviews. The episode garnered 0.39 million viewers when it premiered.

Plot 
Outside the town of Wartwood, a loony native called One-Eyed Wally leaves the pub and is "attacked" by a strange creature.

Meanwhile, the Plantars, which consists of grandfather Hop Pop, 10-year-old Sprig, and the latter's tadpole younger sister Polly, come to town to go shopping. Hop Pop puts Polly in charge of watching the wagon over the older Sprig due to "yesterday being a bad day". An unharmed Wally runs into town raving and ranting about a creature with unusual features that supposedly was trying to eat him. The amphibian townsfolk are in an uproar over the supposed beast. As Mayor Toadstool promises that something will be done about it, Sprig decides that he will be the one to capture the creature so that he can earn Hop Pop's trust back. He bribes Polly with candy who accepts and Sprig hops away into the woods.

Sprig begins his search only to be immediately caught by the beast which is revealed to be a Thai-American human named Anne Boonchuy who has been living in the woods for a week. She rescues Sprig from a giant praying mantis and begin to learn about one another. Anne came from her world and found herself in Amphibia through unknown means. Sprig sympathizes with her and wants to help her. Meanwhile back in town, just as Mayor Toadstool is turning the townsfolk into a mob to hunt for the beast, Hop Pop learns that Sprig is missing and takes Polly into the woods to "rescue" him. Everyone catches up and ties Anne down only for the praying mantis, as well as a bigger one, to arrive and begin attacking the frogs. Sprig and Anne team up and defeat the mantis. Sprig then tells everyone that Anne is just trying to get home and that they should help her. While there is apprehension, Hop Pop agrees to take her in.

Anne wants to leave immediately, but Hop Pop informs her that she will be unable to due to the surrounding area being covered in mountains that are frozen over for the season and that she will have to wait a couple of months. In the meantime, she will have to bunk with the Plantars in their basement. After Sprig says goodnight to Anne, she takes out a music box and opens it, only for nothing to happen. Anne solemnly sighs to herself "Looks like I'm gonna be here for a while".

Production and broadcasting
The episode was directed by Bert Youn, written by show creator, Matt Braly, and story editor Jack Ferraiolo; and storyboarded by Youn, Kyler Spears, and Yonatan Tal.

On April 26, 2019, before the episode's  Disney FanFest released a music video for a vocal version of the opening theme titled ″Welcome to Amphibia″ performed by Celica Gray Westbrook and a two-minute clip during a livestream. It was originally planned to be used as the show's theme song.

On May 14, 2019, Disney Channel released the trailer, with Disney Channel releasing the final version of the intro 3 days later.

Critical reception 
Colliders Dave Trumbore gave both "Anne or Beast?" and "Best Fronds" a 4 stars rating, feeling that they "[served] as a great introduction to the series".

Notes

References

External link 

 

Amphibia (season 1) episodes
American television series premieres
2019 American television episodes
Television episodes about insects